The Mato Grosso dog-faced bat (Neoplatymops mattogrossensis), is a bat species found in South America. It is the only species in the genus Neoplatymops.

Taxonomy and etymology
It was described as a new species in 1942 by C. O. C. Vieira. The holotype was collected along the Juruena River north of the Brazilian state of Mato Grosso.

Description
It is sexually dimorphic, with males larger than the females. Its skull has a flattened appearance. Its dorsal fur is brown, while its ventral fur is white or gray. Both males and females have gular glands.

Biology and ecology
The Mato Grosso dog-faced bat possibly has a harem social structure. In Venezuela, colonies consist of a single male and two to four females. It is a seasonal breeder, with females giving birth once per year at the beginning of the wet season. It is insectivorous.

Range and habitat
It is found in several countries in South America, including Brazil, Colombia, Guyana, and Venezuela.

Conservation
As of 2008, it is evaluated as a least-concern species by the IUCN—its lowest conservation priority.

References

Mammals described in 1942
Molossidae
Bats of South America
Mammals of Colombia
Taxobox binomials not recognized by IUCN